The Courts of Justice Act 1924 was an Act of the Oireachtas (No. 10 of 1924) that established a new system of courts for the Irish Free State (now Ireland or the Republic of Ireland). Among the new courts was the Supreme Court of the Irish Free State, and the first Chief Justice of the Irish Free State was also appointed under the Act.

Once the Act came into operation, the courts previously established by the Parliament of the United Kingdom (when Ireland was still part of the United Kingdom of Great Britain and Ireland) ceased to exist. In parallel with this process, the revolutionary Dáil Courts system created in 1919 during the War of Independence was also wound up, by Acts passed in 1923 and 1925.

The long title of the Act was:
An Act for the establishment of courts of justice pursuant to the Constitution of Saorstát Éireann and for purposes relating to the better administration of justice. [12th April, 1924.]

Court structure

The jurisdiction of all of the courts then sitting in the Irish Free State was transferred to the new courts created by the Act:
 The Court of Appeal was replaced by the Supreme Court of Justice and a Court of Criminal Appeal.
 The High Court of Justice was replaced by a new court with the same name and similar jurisdiction. However, the new court was no longer divided into separate divisions (i.e. the King's Bench and Chancery divisions). The President of the High Court replaced the Lord Chief Justice of Ireland as chief judge of this court.
 The assizes were replaced, in Dublin, by the Central Criminal Court. Outside Dublin they were intended to be replaced by courts of the High Court Circuit, but this was never constituted.
 The jurisdiction of the Quarter Sessions and the county courts was merged into a single Circuit Court of Justice.
 The jurisdiction of the temporary district justices and the divisional magistrates of the Dublin Metropolitan Police Court was merged into a single District Court of Justice, which could also try minor civil matters. The temporary district justices had been introduced in 1923 to replace petty sessions, which had not been held for some years in much of Ireland due to the War of Independence.

The offices of justice of the peace and resident magistrate were permanently abolished. As a result there would in principle no longer be any lay magistrates in the Irish Free State: all judges would be legally qualified and would work full-time. However, the lay office of peace commissioner was created to exercise some of the functions of magistrates.  Section 88(2) of the Act also required that a Peace Commission for a county in the Gaeltacht should "have a knowledge of the Irish language adequate for the transaction of the business of his office in that language".

All criminal prosecutions would now take place in the name of the People at the suit of the Attorney General, rather than The King as had previously been the case.

The Act did not affect the right of appeal from the Free State to the Judicial Committee of the Privy Council in London.

Judicial appointments

Only two judges who held positions under the old court system were appointed to the courts established under this Act: Charles O'Connor, who had been Master of the Rolls in Ireland from 1912, was appointed to the Supreme Court, and William Wylie was appointed to the High Court.

Subsequent developments

Abolition of the Court of the High Court Circuit

The Act established a Central Criminal Court to hear serious criminal cases in Dublin and the neighboring counties, and made provision for Courts of the High Court Circuit (essentially, the Assizes in renamed form) to do the same outside Dublin. However the commissions for these courts were never sent out, leading to a backlog of defendants committed to trial before the courts but not being tried. Amending legislation (the Courts of Justice Act 1926) abolished the Courts of the High Court Circuit and transferred their jurisdiction to the Central Criminal Court. A serious criminal trial was not again held outside Dublin until the Central Criminal Court sat in Limerick in 2003.

After the 1937 Constitution

The courts structure established by the 1924 Act remained largely unchanged in the decades after. When the Courts (Establishment and Constitution) Act 1961 established the new courts envisaged by the 1937 constitution, it merely re-established all the existing courts (removing the "of Justice" from their names to disambiguate) with the same jurisdictions as before. A Special Criminal Court was established in 1972 for the trial of certain offences by a three-judge panel rather than by jury. In 2014, a new Court of Appeal was created with appellate jurisdiction from the High Court, after an amendment to the Constitution the previous year.

See also

Courts of the Republic of Ireland
Dáil Courts#Winding up

External links
The Courts of Justice Act 1924

References

1924 in Irish law
Acts of the Oireachtas of the 1920s
Ireland and the Commonwealth of Nations
Irish Free State